The Armidale Dumaresq Council is a former local government area in the New England and Northern Tablelands regions of New South Wales, Australia. This area was formed in 2000 from the merger of the original City of Armidale with the surrounding Dumaresq Shire and abolished on 12 May 2016, where the council, together with Guyra Shire, was subsumed into the Armidale Regional Council with immediate effect.

The combined former area covered the urban area of Armidale and the surrounding region, extending primarily eastward from the city through farming districts to the gorges and escarpments that mark the edge of the Northern Tablelands.

The last mayor of the Armidale Dumaresq Council was Cr. Herman Beyersdorf until the council was abolished on 12 May 2016, amalgamating with Guyra Shire to form the Armidale Regional Council.

Main towns and villages 

Villages located in the former area included Kellys Plains, Dangarsleigh, Wollomombi and Hillgrove.

Demographics
Aboriginal and Torres Strait Islander people made up 6.3% of the population which is nearly three times higher than both the national and state averages. The median age of people in the Armidale Dumaresq Council area was 35 years; slightly below the national median. Children aged 0 – 14 years made up 19.1% of the population and people aged 65 years and over made up 14.4% of the population. Of people in the area aged 15 years and over, 42.5% were married and 10.7% were either divorced or separated.

Population growth in the Armidale Dumaresq Council area between the 2001 census and the 2011 census was marginal. When compared with total population growth of Australia for the same periods, being 5.78% and 8.32% respectively, population growth in the Armidale Dumaresq local government area was significantly lower than the national average. The median weekly income for residents within the Armidale Dumaresq Council area was below the national average.

At the 2011 census, the proportion of residents in the Armidale Dumaresq local government area who stated their ancestry as Australian or Anglo-Saxon exceeded 78% of all residents (national average was 65.2%). In excess of 58% of all residents in the Armidale Dumaresq Council area nominated a religious affiliation with Christianity at the 2011 census, which was higher than the national average of 50.2%. Meanwhile, as at the census date, compared to the national average, households in the Armidale Dumaresq local government area had a lower than average proportion (7.0%) where two or more languages are spoken (national average was 20.4%); and a higher proportion (88.1%) where English only was spoken at home (national average was 76.8%).

Council

Former composition and election method
Armidale Dumaresq Council was composed of nine councillors elected proportionally as a single ward. All councillors were elected for a fixed four-year term of office. The mayor was elected by the councillors at the first meeting of the council. The most recent and last election was held on 8 September 2012, and the makeup of the council, prior to its abolition, was as follows:

The last Council, elected in 2012 until its abolition in 2016, in order of election, was:

Amalgamation
A 2015 review of local government boundaries recommended that the Armidale Dumaresq Council merge with adjoining councils. The government considered two proposals. The alternative, proposed by the Armidale Dumaresq Council on 1 March 2016, was for an amalgamation of the Armidale Dumaresq, Guyra, Uralla and Walcha councils. Following an independent review, on 12 May 2016 the Minister for Local Government announced that the merger with the Guyra Shire would proceed with immediate effect.

See also

 Local government areas of New South Wales

References

External links
Armidale Dumaresq Council Home Page
Local Government & Municipal Knowledge Base – Armidale Dumaresq Council Page

Former local government areas of New South Wales
New England (New South Wales)
Armidale
2016 disestablishments in Australia
Armidale Regional Council